Ilya Vladimirovich Shabanov (born 13 April 1997) is a Russian football player. He plays for Zenit Izhevsk.

Club career
He made his debut in the Russian Professional Football League for FC Syzran-2003 on 22 September 2018 in a game against FC Lada-Tolyatti.

References

External links
 Profile by Russian Professional Football League
 
 

1997 births
People from Naberezhnye Chelny
Sportspeople from Tatarstan
Living people
Russian footballers
Association football defenders
Russian expatriate footballers
Expatriate footballers in the Czech Republic
Expatriate footballers in Belarus
Czech National Football League players
Belarusian Premier League players
Belarusian First League players
FC Rubin Kazan players
FC Sellier & Bellot Vlašim players
FC Lokomotiv Gomel players
FC Slavia Mozyr players
FC Amkar Perm players
FC Zenit-Izhevsk players